Santi Wibowo (born 15 November 1974) is a Swiss badminton player. She competed in women's singles and mixed doubles at the 1996 Summer Olympics in Atlanta.

References

External links

1974 births
Living people
Swiss female badminton players
Olympic badminton players of Switzerland
Badminton players at the 1996 Summer Olympics
Swiss people of Indonesian descent